The Asian Qualification Tournament for the 2020 Men's Olympic Volleyball Tournament was a volleyball tournament for men's national teams held in Jiangmen, China from 7 to 12 January 2020. 8 teams played in the tournament and the winners Iran qualified for the 2020 Summer Olympics .

Qualification
The top eight teams from the 2019 Asian Championship which had not yet qualified to the 2020 Summer Olympics qualified for the tournament. However, Kazakhstan replaced Pakistan, who withdrew from the tournament. Final standings of the 2019 Asian Championship are shown in brackets.

 (1)
 (2)
 (4)
 (5)
 (6)
 (7) (Withdrew)
 (8)
 (9)
 (10) (Replacement)

Pools composition
Teams were seeded following the serpentine system according to their final standing of the 2019 Asian Championship.

Venue

Pool standing procedure
 Number of matches won
 Match points
 Sets ratio
 Points ratio
 Result of the last match between the tied teams

Match won 3–0 or 3–1: 3 match points for the winner, 0 match points for the loser
Match won 3–2: 2 match points for the winner, 1 match point for the loser

Preliminary round
All times are China Standard Time (UTC+08:00).

Pool A

|}

|}

Pool B

|}

|}

Final round
All times are China Standard Time (UTC+08:00).

Semifinals

|}

Final

|}

Final standing

Qualifying team for Summer Olympics

See also
Volleyball at the 2020 Summer Olympics – Women's Asian qualification

References

External links
Official website – FIVB
Official website – AVC
Final Standing

2020 in volleyball
Volleyball qualification for the 2020 Summer Olympics
2020 in Chinese sport
Sports competitions in Guangdong
International volleyball competitions hosted by China
January 2020 sports events in China